

The Blériot 165 (or Bl-165) was a French airliner of the 1920s.  It was a four-engined biplane, a final development in the family of designs that began with the Blériot 115. Two were built for Air Union to replace the Farman Goliath on their Paris–London route and were christened Leonardo da Vinci and Octave Chanute. The airline found that it preferred the Lioré et Olivier LeO 21s that it had ordered alongside this aircraft, meaning that no further examples were produced.

The second aircraft had originally been fitted with Renault 12Ja inline engines and night-flying equipment and had been designated Blériot 175, but it was soon refitted to the same standard as the first and shared its designation. At one point, plans were made to build a second 175 for Paul Codos to make a long-distance flight from Paris to Tokyo, but this did not eventuate. Similarly, plans to build a bomber version as the Blériot 123 were also abandoned.

Variants
123Projected three-seat bomber version. Not built.
165Original design with 2x  Gnome & Rhône 9Ab engines.
175Powered by 2x  Renault 12Ja, fitted with night-flying gear.

Operators
 
 Air Union

Specifications

References

Bibliography

Further reading
 
 

165
1920s French airliners
Aircraft first flown in 1926
Twin piston-engined tractor aircraft
Biplanes